Poland participated in the Eurovision Song Contest 2007 with the song "Time to Party" written by Kamil Varen, David Junior Serame and Mateusz Krezan. The song was performed by the duo The Jet Set. The Polish broadcaster Telewizja Polska (TVP) organised the national final Piosenka dla Europy 2007 in order to select the Polish entry for the 2007 contest in Helsinki, Finland. The national final took place on 3 February 2007 and featured ten entries. "Time to Party" performed by The Jet Set was selected as the winner after gaining the most public votes.

Poland competed in the semi-final of the Eurovision Song Contest which took place on 10 May 2007. Performing in position 14, "Time to Party" was not announced among the top 10 entries of the semi-final and therefore did not qualify to compete in the final. It was later revealed that Poland placed fourteenth out of the 28 participating countries in the semi-final with 75 points.

Background 
Prior to the 2007 Contest, Poland had participated in the Eurovision Song Contest eleven times since its first entry in 1994. Poland's highest placement in the contest, to this point, has been second place, which the nation achieved with its debut entry in 1994 with the song "To nie ja!" performed by Edyta Górniak. Poland has only, thus far, reached the top ten on one other occasion, when Ich Troje performing the song "Keine Grenzen – Żadnych granic" finished seventh in 2003. In 2005, Poland failed to qualify from the semi-final round, once again failing to qualify to the final in 2006 with their entry "Follow My Heart" performed by Ich Troje.

The Polish national broadcaster, Telewizja Polska (TVP), broadcasts the event within Poland and organises the selection process for the nation's entry. TVP confirmed Poland's participation in the 2007 Eurovision Song Contest on 13 September 2006. In 2006, TVP organised a televised national final that featured a competition among several artists and songs in order to select the Polish entry for the Eurovision Song Contest, a selection procedure that continued for their 2007 entry.

Before Eurovision

Piosenka dla Europy 2007 
Piosenka dla Europy 2007 was the national final organised by TVP in order to select the Polish entry for the Eurovision Song Contest 2007. The show took place on 3 February 2007 at the Studio 5 of TVP in Warsaw, hosted by Artur Orzech and Paulina Chylewska. Public televoting exclusively selected the winner. The show was broadcast on TVP1 and TVP Polonia as well as streamed online at the broadcaster's website tvp.pl. The national final was watched by 3 million viewers in Poland with a market share of 23%.

Competing entries 
TVP opened a submission period for interested artists and songwriters to submit their entries between 13 September 2007 and 15 November 2007. The broadcaster received 90 submissions at the closing of the deadline. A three-member selection committee selected ten entries from the received submissions to compete in the national final. The selection committee consisted of Gina Komasa (Head of Entertainment of TVP), Piotr Klatt (musician, songwriter, journalist and music producer at TVP and artistic director of the Opole Festival) and Zygmunt Kulka (conductor, composer). The selected entries were announced on 23 November 2006.

Final 
The televised final took place on 3 February 2007. Ten entries competed and the winner, "Time to Party" performed by The Jet Set, was determined entirely by a public vote. A four-member expert panel also provided feedback regarding the songs during the show. The experts consisted of Jacek Cygan (songwriter), Grzegorz Skawiński (composer), Agustin Egurrola (dancer and choreographer) and Maciej Zień (fashion designer). In addition to the performances of the competing entries, the band Wilki performed as the interval act.

At Eurovision
According to Eurovision rules, all nations with the exceptions of the host country, the "Big Four" (France, Germany, Spain and the United Kingdom) and the ten highest placed finishers in the 2006 contest are required to qualify from the semi-final on 10 May 2007 in order to compete for the final on 12 May 2007; the top ten countries from the semi-final progress to the final. On 12 March 2007, a special allocation draw was held which determined the running order for the semi-final and Poland was set to perform in position 14, following the entry from Croatia and before the entry from Serbia.

The semi-final and the final were broadcast in Poland on TVP1 and TVP Polonia with commentary by Artur Orzech. The Polish spokesperson, who announced the Polish votes during the final, was Maciej Orłoś.

Semi-final 
The Jet Set took part in technical rehearsals on 5 and 7 May, followed by dress rehearsals on 9 and 10 May. The Polish performance featured the members of The Jet Set joined by four dancers on stage. Sasha Strunin performed in a red dress with black and red-laced boots, while David Junior Serame performed in a vest and striped trousers. The performance began with Strunin and the female dancers in a silver cage with built-in pyrotechnic firework effects, covered with a red cloth which was later removed to reveal the female performers. After escaping the cage to join the male performers, Strunin concluded the performance by ending up back in the cage. The stage was predominantly red with the LED screens displaying star-studded bling, red chains and golden wireframe cityscapes. The performance also featured smoke effects. The choreographers for the Polish performance were Agustin Egurrola and Maja Korzeniowska.

At the end of the show, Poland was not announced among the top 10 entries in the semi-final and therefore failed to qualify to compete in the final. It was later revealed that Poland placed fourteenth in the semi-final, receiving a total of 75 points.

Voting 
Below is a breakdown of points awarded to Poland and awarded by Poland in the semi-final and grand final of the contest. The nation awarded its 12 points to Latvia in the semi-final and to Ukraine in the final of the contest.

Points awarded to Poland

Points awarded by Poland

References

2007
Countries in the Eurovision Song Contest 2007
Eurovision
Eurovision